Idongesit William Ibok (born 17 February 1985) is a Nigerian former professional basketball player, formally a center with the Michigan State University Spartans in the United States. Ibok, a graduate of Montverde Academy in Florida, began attending Michigan State in 2005. He is a three-time all-academic Big Ten Conference. He is 6'11" and 260 lbs, with a 7'5" wingspan.

References
Biography cstv.com
Idong Ibok Stats, espn.com
MSU’s Idong Ibok Lands In D-League

1985 births
Living people
Michigan State Spartans men's basketball players
New Mexico Thunderbirds players
Nigerian men's basketball players
Nigerian expatriate basketball people in the United States
Sportspeople from Lagos
Power forwards (basketball)
Montverde Academy alumni
21st-century Nigerian people